Ahmad Abdalla El Sayed Abdelkader (born on December 19, 1979, Cairo) is an Egyptian film director, editor and screenwriter.

His debut feature film is Heliopolis (2009); his second film is Microphone (2010). He studied music in the 1990s and began working as a film editor in 1999. He moved to feature-length films in 2002 and began doubling as a visual effects supervisor and credits designer.

He was winner of the Best First screenplay Award of Sawiris Foundation in Cairo 2008 for Heliopolis. His upcoming film Rags and Tatters has been selected to be screened in the Contemporary World Cinema section at the 2013 Toronto International Film Festival.

Participated as a jury member in some film festivals like London Film Festival in the 2014 Edition and Carthage film festival and others. Had his first retrospective in Singapore international film festival in 2014.

Festivals and awards

Decor - 2014
Producer by New Century in Cairo, the first high-budget film for him, Starring Khaled Abul Naga, Maged Kidwany and Horeya Farghaly, The film was premiered in London International Film Festival BFI, and announced for the Middle East Premier in Cairo International Film Festival.

Handstand: Breaking Boundaries - 2014
Produced by Red Bull in Cairo, the first Documentary film for B-Boys in Egypt, Starring Charley Breaka and Klash, The film was premiered in Zawya Cinema in downtown Cairo, and caused a buzz in the Breaking scene worldwide.

Rags and Tatters - 2013
Rags and Tatters premiered at Toronto international Film Festival 2013, then participated in the official competition in London International Film Festival and was the finest Arabic film in the competition, and screened at many other festivals like Abu Dhabi Film Festival and the Cinemed International Mediterranean Film Festival of Montpellier.
The film had positive reviews in international press such as Variety, The Guardian, and Huffington Post.

Microphone - 2010 
 World Premier: Toronto international Film Festival 2010
 Won— Golden Tulip from Istanbul International Film Festival - 2011
 Won— Best Film – El Festival de Cine Africano de Tarifa 2011
 Won— Tanit d'or from Journées cinématographiques de Carthage
 Won— Best Editing Award from Dubai International Film Festival
 Won— Best Film- le 9e FESTIVAL des CINÉMAS d'AFRIQUE du PAYS d'Apt, Vaucluse – 2011
 Won— Best Arabic-language film Award from Cairo International Film Festival

Heliopolis - 2009 
 World Premier: Toronto international Film Festival 2009.
 won the Special mention award at Cairo International Film Festival in 2009
 The Original script won the best first screenplay award of Sawiris Foundation in December 2007.

References

External links
Ahmadabdalla.net Director : Ahmad Abdalla official website.

www.africine.org, Ahmad Abdalla at Africiné
 
Variety Review, Variety Review,2009
Toronto Film Festival Heliopolis in Toronto international Film Festival

1979 births
Egyptian film directors
Living people